Thomas Baddeley (1786 or 1787–1823), was an English Roman Catholic priest in Manchester.

Baddeley was the author of the Sure Way to find out the True Religion, a colloquial defence of Roman Catholic principles, largely mingled with invective against Protestantism. The author was stated to be dead in 1825. The tract reached a seventh edition in 1847, and provoked several replies.

References

Roman Catholic writers
1780s births
1823 deaths
19th-century English writers
19th-century English Roman Catholic priests